is a mahjong-focused magazine line created by Takeshobo. The first title published under the line was the text magazine Monthly Kindai Mahjong (1972–1987). It has since then spawned four manga magazines: Kindai Mahjong Original (1980–2013), Bessatsu Kindai Mahjong (1981–present), Kindai Mahjong Gold (1985–2006), and Kindai Mahjong Gamble Com (2006).

History
, described by Takeshobo as "Japan's first mahjong magazine", started in November 1972, one month after the publisher itself was established. It was mainly a text magazine, and it spawned a manga magazine in December 1980, . The original magazine went defunct in 1987, and then Bessatsu changed its title to simply Kindai Mahjong in 1997. In February 2006, Gold ceased its publication and, in March, it was replaced by the short-lived , whose issuance lasted until June 2006. Original had its last issue released in December 2013, and then was reconceptualized as a female character-centered seinen magazine titled , starting from January 2014.

Content
All Kindai Mahjong magazines feature manga series that involve mahjong, although they can vary in genre from comedy to romance or science fiction. Despite the similarities, each has its own editorial staff, emphasis, slogan, and artist line-up. Bessatsus focus is to promote tie-ins with other media, and as such features guest appearances by television personalities like Yoshikazu Ebisu, who wrote a manga in 1994. In addition to the manga, there are also informative articles. The magazine line also advertises mahjong parlors, and Original and Bessatsu also held women's mahjong tournaments and mahjong dating forums to attract female readers.

The magazines also frequently serialize mahjong spin-off of manga originally published in other magazine's series, such as adaptations of Higurashi When They Cry, Iron Wok Jan, and Getter Robo.

Reception
By 1996, Original, Bessatsu and Gold had monthly circulation numbers around 180,000–200,000. At that time, the former two's average readership consisted of people aged 16–22, while the later was read by a public of more than 25 years old. Although most Kindai Mahjong readers are male, comedy manga such as Super Zugan, attracted a considerable female readership.

The Kindai Mahjong magazines were the only mahjong magazines that were not closed because of the effects of the Japanese asset price bubble in late 1980s. Although there were over ten publications in the genre, the recession and the "depressing image" the game had in that period, as Kindai Mahjong editor Michiyuki Miyaji put it, made most of them to close. Miyaji said one of the series that made possible the magazine line survival through that period was Naki no Ryū.

Notes

References

Works cited

External links

1972 establishments in Japan
Semimonthly manga magazines published in Japan
Magazines established in 1972
Seinen manga magazines
Takeshobo